Kvinge may refer to:

Thor Kvinge (born 1929), Norwegian Antarctic scientist
Frank Kvinge (born 1968), Norwegian jazz musician
Kvinge Peninsula, a geographic feature on Antarctica